This is a list of songs which have topped the UK Independent Singles Breakers Chart during the 2020s. The independent record labels given are the ones listed by the official charts.

Number ones

By artist

, 10 artists have spent four or more weeks at the top of the chart so far during the 2020s.

By record label
, Ten record labels have spent four or more weeks at the top of the chart so far during the 2020s.

References

External links
 UK Independent Singles Breakers Chart at the Official Charts Company

Indie Breakers 2020s
2020s in British music
United Kingdom Indie Breakers